Sihu may refer to:

Sihu (instrument), Chinese bowed string instrument
Four hu, a way of classifying Chinese syllable finals
Sihu, Jiangsu (四户镇), town in Pizhou City, Jiangsu, PR China
Sihu, Changhua (溪湖鎮), or Xihu, town in Changhua County, Taiwan
Sihu, Miaoli (西湖鄉), or Xihu, township in Miaoli County, Taiwan
Sihu, Yunlin (四湖鄉), township in Yunlin County, Taiwan